Parahyponomeuta bakeri is a moth of the family Yponomeutidae. It is found on Madeira.

The wingspan is about 20 mm. The forewings are shining olive-brown with a white streak. The hindwings are brownish grey.

References

Moths described in 1894
Yponomeutidae